Kolobrodovo is a rural locality (a village) in Petushinskoye Rural Settlement, Petushinsky District, Vladimir Oblast, Russia. The population was 3 as of 2010.

Geography 
Kolobrodovo is located on the Kuchebishch River, 28 km northwest of Petushki (the district's administrative centre) by road. Zhary is the nearest rural locality.

References 

Rural localities in Petushinsky District